Return Fire is a 1995 video game developed by Silent Software, Inc. for the 3DO Interactive Multiplayer and ported to the PC and PlayStation in 1996. It was preceded by Fire Power (1987) and followed by Return Fire 2 (1998). An expansion pack, Return Fire: Maps O' Death, was released for the 3DO in 1995. Return Fire is a vehicular shooter from a 3D bird's eye view, in which the player's goal is to capture the enemy flag and return with it to their base. It was met with critical acclaim for its unusual gameplay concept, enjoyable multiplayer mode, and classical soundtrack, and is remembered as one of the 3DO's "best games" in its Home of the Underdogs entry.

Gameplay
Return Fire has four specialized vehicles, each one with unique abilities. Each vehicle can carry a limited amount of fuel and ammo (which can be refilled at ammo tents and fuel depots) and can withstand different amounts of damage. If a land vehicle runs out of fuel it stops and the driver jumps out and runs away.

The tank has a 360° rotating turret and the ability to fire at land or air targets. The helicopter cannot resupply itself with fuel and ammunition unless it returns to base, but can strafe at an angle. The HRSV/M270 Multiple Launch Rocket System is the most armored vehicle, but the slowest moving. It has the ability to lay mines which can instantly destroy any land vehicle. The jeep/buggy is the fastest land vehicle and solely possesses the strategic ability to pick, move, and drop flags. Jeeps have the ability to over-inflate their tires and travel across deep water. They are the weakest vehicles, requiring only one hit to destroy.

Only rotating missile turrets and drones are a regular threat to the player in the single player mode. If the player exceeds the boundaries of the map, a submarine emerges and fires a heat-seeking missile against the player.

Production

Audio 
The game soundtrack consists exclusively of public domain music such as Richard Wagner's Ride of the Valkyries when using the helicopter (in homage to Apocalypse Now), Flight of the Bumblebee when driving the jeep, Holst's Mars from The Planets when driving the tank or the William Tell Overture by Gioacchino Rossini when riding with the flag. When driving in the Armored Support Vehicle, Edvard Grieg's In the Hall of the Mountain King plays. During the opening title screen Verdi's "Dies Irae" plays as the "Return Fire" logo appears, engulfed in flame. At the completion of each level, a sequence of unrelated vintage black and white short clips greets the player.

Video sequences 
When a level is completed in the 3DO, PC or PlayStation version a short video clip is shown. One of these is a clip featuring Lou Gehrig's famous Luckiest Man on the Face of the Earth speech.

Release 
A version for the Sega Saturn was developed and completed but never released, until a complete build of the port was leaked online in 2007. Reviews for the Saturn version were published shortly before its targeted release date of May 1997; most reviewers described it as an unacceptably poor conversion of an outstanding game, suffering from a much lower frame rate than the 3DO and PlayStation versions. Another version of the game was also in development by Alexandria Inc. for the Atari Jaguar CD, but development on the port was terminated sometime in 1995 and it was never released for unknown reasons.

The PlayStation release of Return Fire was the final game release by Time Warner Interactive before it was absorbed into Williams Entertainment (later became Midway Home Entertainment) by its new owners WMS Industries.

Reception

GamePro gave the 3DO version a positive review, describing it as "a combination of the best parts of playing Capture the flag, Desert Strike, and Micro Machines." The reviewer complimented the easy-to-master controls, the graphics, and the strong sense of humor. The review team of Electronic Gaming Monthly gave it their "Game of the Month" award, applauding the two-player mode, classical soundtrack, graphics, and general fun of the game. Ed Semrad summarized that "In an industry flooded with sports and fighting carts, this comes as a breath of fresh air." A reviewer for Next Generation also praised the classical soundtrack and the two-player mode, though he added that with its huge number of levels, the game is great fun to play even in single-player mode. He further stated that the graphics and sound effects make causing destruction in the game more fun.

A different reviewer for GamePro covered the PlayStation version, calling it "a brilliantly conceived thrill-a-minute war sim" and "an unprecedented blend of action and strategy". He cited the easy-to-learn controls and game mechanics, frenzied  and enduring multiplayer action, and high level of visual detail. He made special note of the game's classical soundtrack, saying that "Never before has sound been so instrumental to a game's success". Next Generation described it as a near-identical conversion of the 3DO game, and offered it similar praises.

The Return Fire: Maps O' Death expansion pack was also well received. Maximum gave it 4 out of 5 stars, saying that for an exceptionally low price tag, the player is treated to "horribly difficult theatres of war with less vehicles available and some decidedly odd scenery (such as the chessboard and SOS levels), all of which makes the Return Fire sequel an excellent 3DO addition." GamePro stated that it "breathes new life into the year-old game, offering more than 100 fresh levels filled with the carnage and insanity Fire fans love."

Accolades

In 1997 Electronic Gaming Monthly ranked the 3DO version number 63 on their "100 Best Games of All Time", citing its high replayability and the way it "capture[s] the frenetic feeling of combat" to an extent that few games do. They said they chose the 3DO version specifically because the gameplay was tighter than that of the PlayStation version and unreleased Saturn version.

The game was awarded the 3DO Two-Player Game of the Year. In 1996, GamesMaster rated the 3DO version number 1 on their "The GamesMaster 3DO Top 10." In the same issue, they also ranked the 3DO version 51st in their "Top 100 Games of All Time."

Legacy
Return Fire Is featured in the opening scene of Pauly Shore's In the Army Now.

References

External links 
 Return Fire at GameFAQs
 Return Fire at Giant Bomb
 Return Fire at MobyGames

1995 video games
3DO Interactive Multiplayer games
Cancelled Atari Jaguar games
Cancelled Sega Saturn games
GT Interactive games
Helicopter video games
Multiplayer and single-player video games
PlayStation (console) games
Silent Software games
Tank simulation video games
Time Warner Interactive games
Vehicular combat games
Video games developed in the United States
Windows games